Sudbury is a town in Middlesex County, Massachusetts, United States. At the 2020 census, it had a population of 18,934. The town, located in Greater Boston's MetroWest region, has a rich colonial history.

History
Incorporated  in 1639, the boundaries of Sudbury included (by 1653) what is now  Wayland (which split off in 1780, initially as East Sudbury), and parts of present day Framingham, Marlborough, Stow and Maynard (the latter town splitting off in 1871). Nipmuc Indians lived in what is now Sudbury, including Tantamous, a medicine man, and his son Peter Jethro, who deeded a large parcel of land to Sudbury for settlement in 1684.

The original town center and meetinghouse were located near the Sudbury River at what is now known as Wayland's North Cemetery. For the residents on the west side of the river, it was a treacherous passage in the winter and attendance at both worship services and Town Meetings was compulsory.  In 1723 the West Parish meetinghouse was built west of the river at an area known as Rocky Plains (presently the Town Center). It served as a place for both worship and Town Meetings,  After the split with Wayland, the new location grew to have houses, a school, and in 1846, a new Town House. Since then, the Sudbury Center Historic District has changed little.

Sudbury also contributed the most militia during King Philip's War and was the site of the well-known attack on Sudbury. Ephraim Curtis was a successful leader of the militia of West Sudbury and would lend his name to the town's junior high school. Sudbury militia participated in the Battle of Lexington and Concord, in 1775, where Sudbury members sniped on British Red Coats returning to Boston.

One of Sudbury's historic landmarks, the Wayside Inn, claims to be the country's oldest operating inn, built and run by the Howe family for many generations. Henry Wadsworth Longfellow wrote Tales of a Wayside Inn, a book of poems published in 1863. In the book, the poem The Landlord's Tale was the source of the immortal phrase "listen my children and you shall hear, of the midnight ride of Paul Revere." Henry Ford bought the inn in 1923, restored it and donated it to a charitable foundation which continues to run it as an operating inn to this day. Ford also built a boys' school on the property, as well as a grist mill, and the Martha-Mary Chapel. He brought in the Redstone Schoolhouse from Sterling, which was reputed to be the school in Sarah Josepha Hale's nursery rhyme Mary Had a Little Lamb. However, Giuseppi Cavicchio's refusal to sell his water rights scuttled Henry Ford's plans to build an auto parts factory at the site of Charles O. Parmenter's mill in South Sudbury.

In August 1925, a Sudbury farm was the scene of a riot between local members of the Ku Klux Klan and Irish-American youths from the area. Five people were wounded by gunshots, and the State Police arrested over 100 Klansmen. Massachusetts officials cracked down on the group's meetings thereafter, and the Klan died out in the area.

In the period after World War II, Sudbury experienced rapid growth in population and industry. Defense contractor Raytheon was a significant employer, operating a large research facility in Sudbury from 1958 until 2016. Another major employer in that period was Sperry Rand. In the 1970s, the town was home to many of the engineers working in the minicomputer revolution at Digital Equipment Corporation in nearby Maynard. Sudbury was also one of the largest carnation-growing towns, with many greenhouse operations.

From 1960–1969, Sudbury challenged and prevailed against a proposal by Boston Edison Company that would have installed overhead transmission lines through what is now Great Meadows National Wildlife Refuge. Ultimately, the line was instead buried under streets to Maynard.

Residentially, Sudbury's  zoning bylaws helped the town maintain a more rural character through the 1970s and 1980s when developments of single-family Colonials and large Capes established it as an affluent location. Economic growth was restricted to the town's main thoroughfare, US Route 20. Significant tracts of open space—including much wetland—were preserved in the northern half of town and along the Hop Brook corridor flowing from the Wayside Inn Historic District in the southwest part of town through the King Philip Historic District (the site of a conflict in King Philip's War) and into the Sudbury River at the southeast border with Wayland. A significant portion of the Assabet River National Wildlife Refuge (opened in 2005) is located in Sudbury.

Geography

The highest point in Sudbury is on the north slope of Nobscot Hill, and the highest summit is Tippling Rock, which commands a great view of the west of Boston and the tops of the Hancock and Prudential buildings in downtown.

Sudbury is bordered by Wayland (the Sudbury River) on the east; Framingham on the south; Hudson, Maynard, Marlborough, and Stow on the west; Concord on the northeast; and Acton on the north. A larger town, Sudbury also shares a common corner with Lincoln, with which it shares a regional high school, Lincoln-Sudbury High School.

In 1650 the town included Sudbury as well as most of  Wayland and Maynard.

Adjacent towns
Sudbury is located in eastern Massachusetts, bordered by several towns:

Demographics

As of the census of 2000, there were 16,841 people, 5,504 households, and 4,749 families residing in the town. The racial makeup of the town was 94.23% White, 0.80% African American, 0.03% Native American, 3.72% Asian, 0.03% Pacific Islander, 0.23% from other races, and 0.96% from two or more races. Hispanic or Latino of any race were 1.24% of the population. An update in the town's census recorded the population at 18,192 as of 6/10/2015.

There were 5,504 households, out of which 51.1% had children under the age of 18 living with them, 78.5% were married couples living together, 6.2% had a female householder with no husband present, and 13.7% were non-families. 11.0% of all households were made up of individuals, and 5.5% had someone living alone who was 65 years of age or older. The average household size was 3.02 and the average family size was 3.28.

In the town, the population was spread out, with 32.5% under the age of 18, 3.2% from 18 to 24, 27.3% from 25 to 44, 27.2% from 45 to 64, and 9.8% who were 65 years of age or older. The median age was 39 years. For every 100 females, there were 95.4 males. For every 100 females age 18 and over, there were 92.3 males.

The median income for a household in the town was $151,041, and the median income for a family was $222,008. Males had a median income of $148,593 versus $47,500 for females. The per capita income for the town was $75,865. About 2.1% of families and 2.8% of the population were below the poverty line, including 3.9% of those under age 18 and 4.8% of those age 65 or over.

Government

State and federal government
On the federal level, Precincts 1A, 2, 3, 4, and 5 of Sudbury are part of Massachusetts's 5th congressional district, represented by Katherine Clark. Precinct 1 is part of Massachusetts's 3rd congressional district, represented by Lori Trahan. The state's senior (Class I) member of the United States Senate is Elizabeth Warren. The junior (Class II) senator is Ed Markey.

Education
Sudbury students in kindergarten through eighth grade attend Sudbury Public Schools, with high school students attending schools in the Lincoln-Sudbury Regional School District, which was established in 1954, integrating the former Sudbury High School with that of the nearby town of Lincoln, Massachusetts. In 2011, Boston magazine ranked Sudbury's school system 4th in the state, in both of its categories(classroom/academics & Testing/Achievement scores). In subsequent (as well as many prior) years, Sudbury is perennially ranked as a 'Top 20' Massachusetts school system. 

In June 2002, the towns of Lincoln and Sudbury began a $74 million project to build a new high school near the site of the original building. The shared Lincoln-Sudbury Regional High School (LSRHS) is in Sudbury.

The high school's science program student team won the 2006 National Ocean Sciences Bowl championship and came in second in 2005. LSRHS has a nationally recognized school newspaper and school yearbook, The Forum and DYAD, respectively.

There are four elementary schools in Sudbury and one middle school.  The four elementary schools are: 
 Josiah Haynes Elementary School
 Israel Loring Elementary School
 General John Nixon Elementary School
 Peter Noyes Elementary School
The middle school is:
 Ephraim Curtis Middle School
Sudbury has two former elementary schools that were converted to other uses:
 Fairbank Elementary School is now a community center, and the central office for the school district.
 Horse Pond Elementary School is now a Massachusetts State Police Crime Laboratory.

Places of worship

 First Parish of Sudbury. Gathered in 1640 east of the Sudbury River (present day Wayland). "East parish" (now First Parish of Wayland) remained and "West parish" moved to the present site, called Rocky Plains (now Sudbury town center), upon Rev. Israel Loring first preaching there May 6, 1722. The historic meeting house was built in 1797, replacing the original 1723 structure. First Parish became Unitarian in the local schism of 1837 and is now Unitarian Universalist.
 First Baptist Church of Sudbury, Baptist
 Congregation B'nai Torah, Jewish
 Congregation Beth El of the Sudbury River Valley, Jewish
 Chabad Center of Sudbury, Jewish
 Memorial Congregational Church, member of the United Church of Christ. An Open and Affirming Congregation. Formed in the 1837 local schism at First Parish.
 Our Lady of Fatima Parish, Roman Catholic
 Presbyterian Church in Sudbury
 Saint Elizabeth's Episcopal Church
 St. Anselm Rectorate, Roman Catholic
 St. John Evangelical Lutheran Church
 Sudbury United Methodist Church

Notable people

 Horace Abbott, iron manufacturer
 George Hunt Barton, geologist, arctic explorer, and college professor. Founding president of the Boston Children's Museum
Edith Nason Buckingham, zoologist, dog breeder, chicken farmer
 Sarah Cloyce, Salem witch trials survivor; relocated to Sudbury after permanently leaving Salem
 Ralph Adams Cram, architect, resided in Sudbury on Concord Road and built his family a private chapel which is now owned and operated by Saint Elizabeth's Episcopal Church
 Coco Crisp, lived here during some of his time with the Boston Red Sox
 Matthew B. J. Delaney, author
 Dennis Eckersley, baseball Hall of Famer, lived on Morse Road before his years with the Boston Red Sox and on Plympton Road during and after his years with the Red Sox
 Chris Evans, actor
 Scott Evans, actor
 Henry Ford, founder of the Ford Motor Company, lived in Sudbury during parts of the 1920s and 1930s
 Mike Gordon, bassist for Phish
 Robert L. Gordon III, Deputy Under Secretary of Defense
 Michelle Gorgone, Olympic snowboarder
 Edward Hallowell, psychiatrist, author, and specialist on ADD/ADHD
 Eddie House, NBA champion with the Boston Celtics
 Stephen Huneck, artist and writer
 Tyler Jewell, Olympic snowboarder
 Michael Kolowich, documentary filmmaker and technology entrepreneur
 William K. Lietzau Director of the US Defense Counterintelligence and Security Agency
 Tony Massarotti, sports reporter for The Boston Globe
 John Nixon, General in the Continental Army during the American Revolution
 Shaquille O'Neal, four-time NBA champion, 2000 NBA MVP, fifteen-time NBA All-Star, rapper, actor, and current Inside the NBA analyst lived in Sudbury for a brief time
 Samuel Parris, Salem Witch Trials judge and Puritan minister, later preached in Wayland, which was then a part of Sudbury
 Paula Poundstone, comedian, grew up in Sudbury
 Edmund Rice, co-founder and early resident of the town from 1638–1656
 Ashley Richardson (also known as Ashley Montana), model
 Babe Ruth, baseball Hall of Famer. While with the Red Sox, he and his wife rented a small house next to Willis Pond, Sudbury, for the 1917–1918 off-season
 Matt Savage, musician
 Simon Shnapir, Olympic medalist pair skater
 Fred Smerlas, five-time NFL Pro Bowler
 Jarrod Shoemaker, Olympian and Triathlete
 Jeremy Strong, actor and Emmy winner for his role on Succession
 Callie Thorne, actress (Rescue Me)

See also
 Greater Boston
 MetroWest
 Open town meeting

Notes

References
 1871 Atlas of Massachusetts. by Wall & Gray.Map of Massachusetts. Map of Middlesex County.
  History of Middlesex County, Massachusetts, Volume 1 (A–H),  Volume 2 (L–W) compiled by Samuel Adams Drake, published 1879 and 1880. 572 and 505 pages.  Sudbury article by Rev. George A. Oviatt in volume 2 pages 357–381.

External links

 
 Sudbury Chamber of Commerce
 Sudbury Historical Society
 

 
Towns in Middlesex County, Massachusetts
MetroWest
Towns in Massachusetts
Populated places established in 1638
1638 establishments in Massachusetts